Barbazan is a commune in the Haute-Garonne department in the Occitanie region of south-western France.

The inhabitants of the commune are known as Barbazanais or Barbazanaises.

Geography
Barbazan is a Spa town in the Comminges region located some 13 km south-west of Saint-Gaudens and 12 km north of Cierp-Gaud. The western border of the commune is also the departmental border between Haute-Garonne and Hautes-Pyrénées. Access to the commune is by Route nationale N125 which comes from the end of the A645 autoroute and passes down the western side of the commune south to Ore. The D26E road comes from Labroquère in the north-west and passes through the north of the commune ending in the village. The D26 comes from Valcabrère in the west and passes through the village continuing to Sauveterre-de-Comminges in the east. The D33D and the D33L go south from the village to join the N125. The commune has extensive forests in the east with some farmland in the west.

The Garonne river forms most of the western border of the commune as it flows north, passing through Toulouse, to eventually join the Dordogne to form the Gironde estuary at Bordeaux. Lake Barbazan, north-west of the village at 452 m above sea level, is of glacial origin. It is surrounded by moraine deposits: sub-glacial moraine from Cumania and rocky outcrops of moraine west of the Lake. The Ruisseau de Corp flows west from the lake to join the Garonne.

Neighbouring communes and villages

Heraldry

Administration
List of Successive Mayors

Mayors from 1937

Demography
In 2017 the commune had 490 inhabitants. However, in 2018, the commune had 492 inhabitants.

Sites and monuments
Barbazan has two sites that are registered as historical monuments:
The Chateau of Bagen (1544)
The Flower Garden in the Chateau of Bagen on the D26 road

Other sites of interest
The Thermal baths
The Lake
The Church of Saint-Michel

Notable people linked to the commune
Jacques-Marie d'Astorg (1752-1822), Count of Astorg and Roquépine, Baron of Montégut, French soldier in the 18th and 19th centuries.

See also
Communes of the Haute-Garonne department
List of spa towns in France
Thermal baths

References

External links
Barbazan official website 
Barbazan Tourism website 
Barbazan on the Community of Communes of Haut-Comminges website 
Barbazan on Géoportail, National Geographic Institute (IGN) website 
Barbazan on the 1750 Cassini Map

Communes of Haute-Garonne